John Levi Sheppard (April 13, 1852 – October 11, 1902) was an American lawyer, judge, and legislator.

Biography
Sheppard was born in Bluffton, Alabama on April 13, 1852.  As a child he moved with his mother to Morris County, Texas, where he attended the local schools.  Sheppard then studied law, was admitted to the bar in 1879, and began to practice in Daingerfield.

A Democrat, Sheppard served as district attorney of the fifth judicial district from 1882 to 1888, and district judge from 1888 to 1896.  He was temporary chairman of the state Democratic convention in 1892, and a delegate to the 1893 Bimettalist convention.  He was also a delegate to the 1896 Democratic National Convention.

In 1898 Sheppard was elected to the United States House of Representatives from the Fourth Congressional District of Texas.  He served in the 56th and 57th Congresses, and held office from March 4, 1899 until his death.

Sheppard died in Texarkana, Texas on October 11, 1902.  He was buried at Rose Hill Cemetery in Texarkana.

Family
Sheppard was married to Margaret Alice Eddins (1854-1905).  Their children included Morris Sheppard, an attorney who was in practice with his father. He was elected to Congress in the seat his father had filled, and later elected by the state legislature as United States Senator from Texas, serving for decades.

Sheppard was the great-grandfather of Senator Connie Mack III and great-great-grandfather of Representative Connie Mack IV, both of Florida.

See also
List of United States Congress members who died in office (1900–49)

External links

 Memorial addresses on the life and character of John Levi Sheppard late a representative from Texas delivered in the House of Representatives and Senate frontispiece 1903

1852 births
1902 deaths
Texas lawyers
People from Cherokee County, Alabama
People from Texarkana, Texas
Texas state court judges
County district attorneys in Texas
Burials in Texas
Democratic Party members of the United States House of Representatives from Texas
19th-century American politicians
People from Daingerfield, Texas
19th-century American judges
People from Morris County, Texas